

August 31, 2004 (Tuesday)
 Football (soccer): Manchester United F.C. sign England star Wayne Rooney from Everton F.C.  The potential fee of £27 million is the second highest ever for an exclusively British transfer. (Reuters)

August 30, 2004 (Monday)
 Football (soccer): Newcastle United F.C. dismiss their manager, Sir Bobby Robson, following a poor start to their Premier League season and alleged discontent in the dressing room.  Striker Alan Shearer is named caretaker manager and is rumoured to be Robson's permanent replacement. (Reuters)
 Ice hockey: The 2004 World Cup of Hockey begins with Finland blanking the Czech Republic 4–0 in the opening match held in Helsinki. (AP)

August 29, 2004 (Sunday)
 2004 Summer Olympics:
 Men's Marathon: Vanderlei de Lima from Brazil is pushed into the crowd by Cornelius Horan (who ran onto the track during the Formula One 2003 British Grand Prix at Silverstone) while leading in the last 10 km of the race. Vanderlei loses around 15–20 seconds but finishes in third place. (BBC)
 Gold medal winners on day 16: (BBC)
 Athletics
 Men's Marathon: Stefano Baldini, ITA
 Boxing:
 Men's Under 48 kg: Yan Bartelemí Varela, CUB
 Men's 51–54 kg: Guillermo Rigondeaux Ortiz, CUB
 Men's 57–60 kg: Mario Cesar Kindelan Mesa, CUB
 Men's 64–69 kg: Bakhtiyar Artayev, KAZ
 Men's 75–81 kg: Andre Ward, USA
 Men's Over 91 kg: Alexander Povetkin, RUS
 Handball:
 Men: Croatia
 Women: Denmark
 Gymnastics:
 Women's Individual All-Around Rhythmic: Alina Kabaeva, RUS
 Taekwondo:
 Women's Over 67 kg: Zhong Chen, CHN
 Men's Over 80 kg: Dae Sung Moon, KOR
 Volleyball:
 Men: Brazil
 Water Polo:
 Men: Hungary
 Wrestling:
 Men's Freestyle 60 kg: Yandro Miguel Quintana, CUB
 Men's Freestyle 74 kg: Buvaysa Saytiev, RUS
 Men's Freestyle 96 kg: Khadjimourat Gatsalov, RUS
Kimi Räikkönen wins the Belgian Grand Prix Formula One ahead of Michael Schumacher, who clinches his seventh championship title. (BBC)
Baseball: Team Curaçao beats team Thousand Oaks, California, 5–2, to win the Little League World Series. (ESPN)

August 28, 2004 (Saturday)
 2004 Summer Olympics: Gold medal winners on day 15: (BBC)
 Athletics:
 Women's High Jump: Yelena Slesarenko, RUS
 Women's 1500 m: Kelly Holmes, GBR
 Men's Javelin: Andreas Thorkildsen, NOR
 Men's 800 m: Yuriy Borzakovskiy, RUS
 Men's 5000 m: Hicham El Guerrouj, MAR
 Men's 4 × 100 m Relay: Great Britain (Jason Gardener, Darren Campbell, Marlon Devonish, Mark Lewis-Francis)
 Men's 4 × 400 m Relay: United States (Otis Harris, Derrick Brew, Jeremy Wariner, Darold Williamson)
 Women's 4 × 400 m Relay: United States (DeeDee Trotter, Monique Henderson, Sanya Richards, Monique Hennagan)
 Basketball:
 Men: Argentina
 Women: United States
 Boxing:
 Men's 48–51 kg: Yuriorkis Gamboa Toledano. CUB
 Men's 54–57 kg: Kim Song Guk, PRK
 Men's 60–64 kg: Manus Boonjumnong, THA
 Men's 69–75 kg: Gaydarbek Gaydarbekov, RUS
 Men's 81–91 kg: Odlanier Solís Fonte, CUB
 Canoeing:
 Men's K-1 500 m: Adam van Koeverden, CAN
 Men's C-1 500 m: Andreas Dittmer, GER
 Women's K-1 500 m: Natasa Janics, HUN
 Men's K-2 500 m: Ronald Rauhe, Tim Wieskoetter, GER
 Men's C-2 500 m: Meng Guanliang, Yang Wenjun, CHN
 Women's K-2 500 m: Katalin Kovács, Natasa Janics, HUN
 Cycling:
 Men's Individual Mountain Bike: Julien Absalon, FRA
 Diving:
 Men's 10 m Platform: Jia Hu, CHN
 Football:
 Men: Argentina
 Gymnastics:
 Women's Group Rhythmic: Russia
 Sailing:
 Men's Keelboat: Torben Grael, Marcelo Ferreira, BRA
 Men's Multihull: Roman Hagara, Hans Peter Steinacher, AUS
 Taekwondo:
 Women's 57–67 kg: Wei Luo, CHN
 Men's 68–80 kg: Steven López, USA
 Volleyball:
 Women: People's Republic of China
 Wrestling:
 Men's Freestyle 55 kg: Mavlet Batirov, RUS
 Men's Freestyle 66 kg: Elbrus Tedeyev, UKR
 Men's Freestyle 84 kg: Cael Sanderson, USA
 Men's Freestyle 120 kg: Artur Taymazov, UZB
NASCAR Nextel Cup:  Dale Earnhardt Jr. wins the Sharpie 500 at Bristol Motor Speedway.  The win is Junior's first since being badly burnt in practice for a Trans-Am race, and comes a day after winning the Busch Series race held at the same track.  ESPN.com

August 27, 2004 (Friday)
 2004 Summer Olympics: Gold medal winners on day 14: (BBC)
 Athletics:
 Women's 10,000 m: Xing Huina, CHN
 Men's 100 m Hurdles: Liu Xiang, CHN
 Women's 4 × 100 m Relay: Jamaica (Tayna Lawrence, Sherone Simpson, Aleen Bailey, Veronica Campbell)
 Men's 50 km Race Walk: Robert Korzeniowski, POL
 Women's Javelin Throw: Osleidys Menéndez, CUB
 Women's Long Jump: Tatyana Lebedeva, RUS
 Men's Pole Vault: Timothy Mack, USA
 Canoeing:
 Men's C-1 1000 m: David Cal, ESP
 Men's C-2 1000 m: Germany (Christian Gille, Tomasz Wylenzek)
 Men's K-1 1000 m: Eirik Verås Larsen, NOR
 Men's K-2 1000 m: Sweden (Markus Oscarsson, Henrik Nilsson)
 Men's K-4 1000 m: Hungary (Zoltan Kammerer, Botond Storcz, Ákos Vereckei, Gabor Horvath)
 Women's K-4 500 m: Germany (Birgit Fischer, Maike Nollen, Katrin Wagner, Carolin Leonhardt)
 Cycling:
 Women's Individual Mountain Bike: Gunn-Rita Dahle, NOR
 Equestrian:
 Mixed Individual Show Jumping: Cian O'Connor – Waterford Crystal, IRE
 Hockey:
 Men: Australia
 Modern pentathlon:
 Women's Individual: Zsuzsanna Vörös, HUN
 Synchronized Swimming:
 Women's Team: Russia
 Taekwondo:
 Women's 49–57 kg: Ji Won Jang, KOR
 Men's 58–68 kg: Hadia Saei Bonehkohal, IRN

August 26, 2004 (Thursday)
 2004 Summer Olympics: Gold medal winners on day 13: (BBC)
 Athletics:
 Men's 200 m: Shawn Crawford, USA
 Men's 400 m Hurdles: Félix Sánchez, DOM
 Men's Long Jump: Dwight Phillips, USA
 Diving:
 Women's 3 m Springboard: Jingjing Guo, CHN
 Football:
 Women: United States
 Hockey:
 Women: Germany
 Modern pentathlon:
 Men's Individual: Andrey Moiseev, RUS
 Sailing:
 Mixed 49er: Iker Martínez and Xabier Fernández, ESP
 Taekwondo:
 Women's Under 49 kg: Shih Hsin Chen, TPE
 Men's Under 58 kg: Mu Yen Chu, TPE
 Triathlon:
 Men's Individual: Hamish Carter, NZL
 Water Polo:
 Women: Italy
 Wrestling:
 Men's Greco-Roman 55–60 kg: Ji Hyun Jung, KOR
 Men's Greco-Roman 66–74 kg: Alexandr Dokturishivili, UZB
 Men's Greco-Roman 84–96 kg: Karam Ibrahim, EGY
 Men's Greco-Roman 96–120 kg: Khasan Baroyev, RUS
 UEFA Cup 2004–05 Second qualifying round second leg. Teams progressing to the first round proper in bold:
CSKA Sofia 3 – 1 AC Omonia
FC Zenit St Peterburg 2 – 0 SV Pasching (Zenit win on away goals rule)
NK Maribor 0 – 1 FK Budućnost Banatski Dvor (Maribor win on away goals rule)
PFC Litex Lovech 7 – 0 NK Željeznicar Sarajevo
 NK Primorje 2 – 0 Dinamo Zagreb
 NK Rijeka 2 – 1 Gençlerbirligi (Gençlerbirligi win on away goals rule)
 FK Modriča 0 – 3 PFC Levski Sofia
 KF Partizani Tirana 1 – 3 Hapoel Bnei Sakhnin FC
FC Steaua București 1 – 2 FC Železnik
 Servette FC 0 – 2 Újpest FC
 FC Tiraspol 1 – 2 FC Metalurh Donetsk
Legia Warszawa 6 – 0 FC Tbilisi
 Budapest Honvéd FC 1 – 0 Amica Wronki
IF Elfsborg 2 – 1 Glentoran F.C.
 FC Vaduz 1 – 2 K.S.K.Beveren
 FK Ekranas 2 – 1 Odd Grenland
 Brøndby IF 1 – 1 FK Ventspils (Ventspils win on away goals rule)
 ÍA Akranes 1 – 2 Hammarby IF
 FC Haka 1 – 3 Stabæk
 FC Levadia Tallinn 2 – 1 F.K. Bodø/Glimt
 Dunfermline Athletic F.C. 1 – 2 Fimleikafélag Hafnarfjarðar
Aalborg Boldspilklub 0 – 0 FK Žalgiris Vilnius
FK Liepājas Metalurgs 1 – 1 Östers IF (Metalurgs win on away goals rule)
FK Partizan 1 – 0 FC Oţelul Galaţi
Maccabi Petach Tikva FC 4 – 0 AEK Larnaca F.C.
 Lech Poznań 0 – 1 FC Terek Grozny
Dinamo Tbilisi FC 2 – 0 SK Slavia Praha (Dinamo win on away goals rule)
 FC Rubin Kazan 0 – 3 SK Rapid Wien
FK Austria Wien 3 – 0 FC Illichivets Mariupol
 FC Wil 1900 1 – 1 FK Dukla Banská Bystrica
SK Sigma Olomouc 4 – 0 FC Nistru Otaci
FC Dnipro Dnipropetrovsk 1 – 1 FC Artmedia Bratislava (UEFA.com)

August 25, 2004 (Wednesday)
 2004 Summer Olympics: Gold medal winners on day 12: (BBC)
 Athletics:
 Women's 200 m: Veronica Campbell, JAM
 Women's 400 m Hurdles: Fani Halkia, GRE
 Women's Hammer Throw: Olga Kuzenkova, RUS
 Baseball:
 Men: Cuba
 Beach Volleyball:
 Men: Ricardo Alex Santos and Emanuel Rego, BRA
 Cycling:
 Men's Keirin: Ryan Bayley, AUS
 Men's Madison: Graeme Brown and Stuart O'Grady, AUS
 Women's Points Race: Olga Slyusareva, RUS
 Equestrian:
 Mixed Individual Dressage: Anky van Grunsven – Salinero, NED
 Sailing:
 Men's Windsurfing Mistral: Gal Fridman, ISR
 Women's Windsurfing Mistral: Faustine Merret, FRA
 Synchronized Swimming:
 Women's Duet: Anastasia Davydova and Anastasia Ermakova, RUS
 Triathlon:
 Women's Individual: Kate Allen, AUT
 Weightlifting:
 Men's Over 105 kg: Hossein Reza Zadeh, IRN
 Wrestling:
 Men's Greco-Roman Under 55 kg: István Majoros, HUN
 Men's Greco-Roman 60–66 kg: Farid Mansurov, AZE
 Men's Greco-Roman 74–84 kg: Aleksey Mishin, RUS
 FA Premier League: Arsenal beat Blackburn Rovers 3–0 to set a new record of 43 consecutive league matches without defeat. Nottingham Forest's previous record stood for 26 years. (BBC)
 UEFA Champions League 2004–05 Third qualifying round, second leg. Teams progressing to the group stage in bold:
 Trabzonspor 0 – 2 Dynamo Kyiv
Maccabi Tel Aviv F.C. 1 – 0 P.A.O.K. F.C.
 Rangers F.C. 1 – 1 PFC CSKA Moskva
AC Sparta Praha 2 – 0 Ferencváros (aet)
Manchester United F.C. 3 – 0 F.C. Dinamo București
 Club Brugge KV 2 – 2 FC Shakhtar Donetsk
PSV Eindhoven 5 – 0 FK Crvena Zvezda
 FC Baník Ostrava 2 – 1 Bayer Leverkusen
 Djurgårdens IF 1 – 4 Juventus
Real Madrid 3 – 1 Wisła Kraków (UEFA.com)

August 24, 2004 (Tuesday)
 2004 Summer Olympics:
 Athletics: After "refusing or failing to admit a urine sample", men's Discus champion Róbert Fazekas (HUN) is stripped of his title. Virgilijus Alekna (LTU) now receives the gold medal. (BBC)
 Gold medal winners on day 11: (BBC)
 Athletics:
 Women's 100 m Hurdles: Joanna Hayes, USA
 Men's 1500 m: Hicham El Guerrouj, MAR
 Men's 3000 m Steeplechase: Ezekiel Kemboi, KEN
 Women's 400 m: Tonique Williams-Darling, BAH
 Men's Decathlon: Roman Šebrle, CZE
 Women's Pole Vault: Yelena Isinbayeva, RUS
 Beach Volleyball:
 Women: Kerri Walsh and Misty May, USA
 Cycling:
 Men's Points Race: Mikhail Ignatiev, RUS
 Men's Sprint: Ryan Bayley, AUS
 Women's Sprint: Lori-Ann Muenzer, CAN
 Diving:
 Men's 3 m Springboard: Bo Peng, CHN
 Equestrian:
 Mixed Team Jumping: Germany (Ludger Beerbaum – Goldfever, Marco Kutscher – Montender, Otto Becker – Cento, Christian Ahlmann – Coster)
 Weightlifting:
 Men's 94–105 kg: Dmitry Berestov, RUS
 UEFA Champions League 2004–05 Third qualifying round, second leg. Teams progressing to the group stage in bold:
Liverpool 0–1 Grazer AK
Anderlecht 3–0 Benfica
AS Monaco 6–0 NK Gorica
Internazionale 4–1 Basel
Deportivo de La Coruña 3–0 Shelbourne
 Maccabi Haifa 2–3 Rosenborg (UEFA.com)

August 23, 2004 (Monday)
 2004 Summer Olympics:
 Athletics: Shot put winner Irina Korzhanenko (RUS) fails a drug test and is stripped of her gold medal. The Olympic title goes to Yumileidi Cumbá (CUB) instead. (BBC)
 Gold medal winners on day 10: (BBC)
 Athletics:
 Women's 20 km Race Walk: Athanasia Tsoumeleka, GRE
 Men's 400 m: Jeremy Wariner, USA
 Women's 5000 m: Meseret Defar, ETH
 Women's 800 m: Kelly Holmes, GBR
 Men's Discus: Virgilijus Alekna, LTU (revised result: see August 24)
 Women's Triple Jump: Françoise Mbango Etone, CMR
 Cycling:
 Men's Team Pursuit 400 m: Australia (Graeme Brown, Brett Lancaster, Brad McGee, Luke Roberts)
 Gymnastics:
 Women's Balance Beam: Cătălina Ponor, ROM
 Women's Floor Exercise: Cătălina Ponor, ROM
 Men's Horizontal Bar: Igor Cassina, ITA
 Men's Horse Vault: Gervasio Deferr, ESP
 Men's Parallel Bars: Valeri Goncharov, UKR
 Table Tennis:
 Men's Singles: Seung Min Ryu, KOR
 Weightlifting:
 Men's 85–94 kg: Milen Dobrev, BUL
 Wrestling:
 Women's Freestyle Under 48 kg: Irini Merleni, UKR
 Women's Freestyle 48–55 kg: Saori Yoshida, JPN
 Women's Freestyle 55–63 kg: Kaori Icho, JPN
 Women's Freestyle 63–72 kg: Xu Wang, CHN

August 22, 2004 (Sunday)
 2004 Summer Olympics: gold medal winners on day 9: (BBC)
 Athletics:
 Men's 100 m: Justin Gatlin, USA
 Men's hammer throw: Adrián Annus, HUN
 Men's high jump: Stefan Holm, SWE
 Men's triple jump: Christian Olsson, SWE
 Women's marathon: Mizuki Noguchi, JPN
 Cycling:
 Women's individual pursuit 3000 m: Sarah Ulmer, NZL
 Diving:
 Women's 10 m platform: Chantelle Newbery, AUS
 Fencing:
 Men's team épée: France (Hugues Obry, Érik Boisse, Fabrice Jeannet, Jérôme Jeannet)
 Gymnastics:
 Women's asymmetric bars: Émilie Lepennec, FRA
 Men's floor exercise: Kyle Shewfelt, CAN
 Women's horse vault: Monica Roşu, ROM
 Men's pommel horse: Haibin Teng, CHN
 Men's rings: Dimosthenis Tampakos, GRE
 Rowing:
 Men's lightweight coxless four: Denmark (Thor Kristensen, Thomas Ebert, Stephan Mølvig, Eskild Ebbesen)
 Men's coxless quadruple sculls: Russia (Nikolay Spinyov, Igor Kravtsov, Aleksey Svirin, Sergey Fedorovtsev)
 Women's coxless quadruple sculls: Germany (Kathrin Boron, Meike Evers, Manuela Lutze, Kerstin El Qalqili)
 Men's eight: United States (Jason Read, Wyatt Allen, Chris Ahrens, Joseph Hansen, Matt Deakin, Dan Beery, Beau Hoopman, Bryan Volpenhein, Peter Cipollone)
 Women's eight: Romania (Rodica Florea, Viorica Susanu, Aurica Bărăscu, Ioana Papuc, Liliana Gafencu, Elisabeta Lipă, Georgeta Damian, Doina Ignat, Elena Georgescu)
 Men's lightweight double sculls: Poland (Tomasz Kucharski, Robert Sycz)
 Women's lightweight double sculls: Romania (Constanța Burcică, Angela Alupei)
 Sailing:
 Women's Europe: Siren Sundby, NOR
 Mixed Laser: Robert Scheidt, BRA
 Shooting:
 Men's 50 m free rifle 3 positions: Zhanbo Jia, CHN
 Men's skeet: Andrea Benelli, ITA
 Table tennis:
 Women's singles: Zhang Yining, CHN
 Tennis:
 Men's singles: Nicolás Massú, CHI
 Women's doubles: Li Ting and Sun Tiantian, CHN
NASCAR Nextel Cup: Greg Biffle wins the GFS Marketplace 400 in Brooklyn, Michigan for his second career Nextel Cup victory. Biffle leads nearly half of the laps in a car featuring a special Justice League paint scheme. (ESPN.com)

August 21, 2004 (Saturday)
 2004 Summer Olympics:
 Rowing: Matthew Pinsent wins his fourth gold in consecutive Olympics in the men's coxless four. Pinsent, Ed Coode, James Cracknell and Steve Williams hold off the Canadian world champions to win by 0.08s. (BBC)
 Equestrian: After an appeal to the Court of Arbitration for Sport by Great Britain, France and the United States, the results of the Mixed Individual and Mixed Team competitions are changed. Penalty points awarded to Bettina Hoy of Germany for crossing the start gate twice, then removed on appeal (giving Hoy the individual gold and Germany the team gold), are reinstated. Leslie Law (GBR) is awarded the individual gold, and France the team gold. (BBC)
 Gold medal winners on day 8: (BBC)
 Archery:
 Men's Team (70 m): Korea (Dong Hyun Im, Yong Ho Jang, Kyung Mo Park)
 Athletics:
 Women's 100 m: Yulia Nestsiarenka, BLR
 Women's Discus: Natalya Sadova, RUS
 Women's Heptathlon: Carolina Klüft, SWE
 Badminton:
 Women's Doubles: Zhang Jiewen and Yang Wei, CHN
 Men's Singles: Taufik Hidayat, INA
 Cycling:
 Men's Individual Pursuit: Bradley Wiggins, GBR
 Men's Team Sprint: Germany (Jens Fiedler, Stefan Nimke, René Wolff)
 Equestrian:
 Dressage Mixed Team: Germany (Ulla Salzgeber – Rusty, Martin Schaudt – Weltall, Hubertus Schmidt – Wansuela Suerte, Heike Kemmer – Bonaparte)
 Fencing:
 Men's Team Foil: Italy (Simone Vanni, Salvatore Sanzo, Andrea Cassarà)
 Gymnastics:
 Men's Individual Trampoline: Yuri Nikitin, UKR
 Rowing:
 Men's Coxless Four: Great Britain (Steve Williams, James Cracknell, Ed Coode, Matthew Pinsent)
 Men's Coxless Pair: Australia (Drew Ginn, James Tomkins)
 Women's Coxless Pair: Romania (Georgeta Damian, Viorica Susanu)
 Men's Double Sculls: France (Sébastien Vieilledent, Adrien Hardy)
 Women's Double Sculls: New Zealand (Georgina Evers-Swindell, Caroline Evers-Swindell)
 Men's Single Sculls: Olaf Tufte, NOR
 Women's Single Sculls: Katrin Rutschow-Stomporowski, GER
 Sailing:
 Men's 470: United States (Paul Foerster, Kevin Burnham)
 Women's 470: Greece (Sofia Bekatorou, Aimilia Tsoulfa)
 Men's Finn: Ben Ainslie, GBR
 Women's Yngling: Great Britain (Shirley Robertson, Sarah Webb, Sarah Ayton)
 Shooting:
 Men's 25m Rapid Fire Pistol: Ralf Schumann, GER
 Swimming:
 Men's 1500 m Freestyle: Grant Hackett, AUS
 Men's 4 × 100 m Medley Relay: United States (Aaron Peirsol, Brendan Hansen, Ian Crocker, Jason Lezak)
 Women's 4 × 100 m Medley Relay: Australia (Giaan Rooney, Leisel Jones, Petria Thomas, Jodie Henry)
 Women's 50 m Freestyle: Inge de Bruijn, NED
 Table Tennis:
 Men's Doubles: Qi Chen and Ma Lin, CHN
 Tennis:
 Women's Singles: Justine Henin-Hardenne, BEL
 Men's Doubles: Fernando González and Nicolás Massú, CHI
 Weightlifting:
 Men's 77–85 kg: George Asanidze, GEO
 Women's Over 75 kg: Tang Gonghong, CHN
 Test cricket: England beat the West Indies by ten wickets in the fourth and final Test match, at The Oval. England have now won seven consecutive Test matches, a feat they haven't achieved for 75 years. (BBC)
 Rugby union: In the final match of the Tri Nations Series held in Durban, the Springboks (South Africa) hold off a late charge by the Wallabies (Australia) to win 23–19, winning the Tri Nations for the first time since 1998.

August 20, 2004 (Friday)
 English football player Jonathan Woodgate makes a surprise move from Newcastle United to Spanish side Real Madrid, for a transfer fee of £15 million. Woodgate is the second English footballer in the space of a week to sign for Real, following Michael Owen's transfer from Liverpool. They join fellow Englishman David Beckham, who has been a player at the club for a year.
 2004 Summer Olympics: Gold medal winners on day 7: (BBC)
 Archery:
 Women's Team (70 m): Korea (Lee Sung-jin, Park Sung-hyun, Yun Mi-jin)
 Athletics:
 Men's 10,000 m: Kenenisa Bekele, ETH
 Men's 20 km Walk: Ivano Brugnetti, ITA
 Badminton:
 Men's Doubles: Kim Dong-moon and Ha Tae-kwon, KOR
 Canoeing:
 Men's C-2 Slalom: Pavol Hochschorner and Peter Hochschorner, SVK
 Men's K-1 Slalom: Benoît Peschier, FRA
 Cycling:
 Men's 1 km Time Trial: Chris Hoy, GBR
 Women's 500 m Time Trial: Anna Meares, AUS
 Fencing:
 Women's Team Épée: Russia (Oxana Ermakova, Anna Sivkova, Tatiana Logounova, Karina Aznavourian)
 Gymnastics:
 Women's Individual Trampoline: Anna Dogonadze, GER
 Judo:
 Men's Over 100 kg: Keiji Suzuki, JPN
 Women's Over 78 kg: Maki Tsukada, JPN
 Shooting:
 Men's 50 m Free Rifle Prone: Matthew Emmons, USA
 Women's 50 m Rifle 3 Positions: Lioubov Galkina, RUS
 Swimming:
 Men's 100 m Butterfly: Michael Phelps, USA
 Men's 50 m Freestyle: Gary Hall, USA
 Women's 200 m Backstroke: Kirsty Coventry, ZIM
 Women's 800 m Freestyle: Ai Shibata, JPN
 Table Tennis:
 Women's Doubles: Nan Wang and Yining Zhang, CHN
 Weightlifting:
 Women's 69–75 kg: Pawina Thongsuk, THA
Boxing: Former world Heavyweight champion Riddick Bowe announces he will attempt a comeback.(ESPN)

August 19, 2004 (Thursday)

 2004 Summer Olympics: Gold medal winners on day 6: (BBC)
 Archery:
 Men's Individual (70 m): Marco Galiazzo, ITA
 Badminton:
 Mixed Doubles: Zhang Jun and Gao Ling, CHN
 Women's Singles: Zhang Ning, CHN
 Fencing:
 Men's Team Sabre: France (Gaël Touya, Julien Pillet, Damien Touya)
 Gymnastics:
 Women's Artistic Individual All-Around: Carly Patterson, USA
 Judo:
 Women's 70–78 kg: Noriko Anno, JPN
 Men's 90–100 kg: Ihar Makarau, BLR
 Shooting:
 Men's 10 m Running Target: Manfred Kurzer, GER
 Women's Skeet: Diána Igaly, HUN
 Swimming:
 Women's 100 m Freestyle: Jodie Henry, AUS
 Women's 200 m Breaststroke: Amanda Beard, USA
 Men's 200 m Backstroke: Aaron Peirsol, USA
 Men's 200 m Medley: Michael Phelps, USA
 Weightlifting:
 Women's 62–69 kg: Chunhong Liu, CHN
 Men's 69–77 kg: Taner Sağır, TUR

August 18, 2004 (Wednesday)
 2004 Summer Olympics:
 Athletics: Konstantinos Kenteris and Ekaterini Thanou, who missed a mandatory drugs test last Thursday, withdraw from the games after an IOC disciplinary hearing – even though the IOC chose not to take any action against them. A meeting of the IAAF on August 26 will consider whether a doping offence has been committed. (BBC)
 Equestrian: Bettina Hoy of Germany crosses the start line twice, and is awarded penalty points. After an appeal, the points are removed. This gives Hoy the gold medal in the individual event, and Germany gold in the team event, overturned on appeal (see August 21).
 Gold medal winners on day 5: (BBC)
 Archery:
 Women's Individual (70 m): Park Sung-hyun, KOR
 Athletics:
 Men's Shot Put: Yuriy Bilonog, UKR
 Women's Shot Put: Yumileidi Cumbá, CUB (revised result: See August 23)
 Canoeing:
 Men's C-1 Slalom: Tony Estanguet, FRA
 Women's K-1 Slalom: Elena Kaliská, SVK
 Cycling:
 Men's Individual Time Trial: Tyler Hamilton, USA
 Women's Individual Time Trial: Leontien Zijlaard-Van Moorsel, NED
 Equestrian:
 Mixed Individual: Leslie Law, Shear L'Eau, GBR (result changed after appeal)
 Mixed Team: France (Nicolas Touzaint – Galan de Sauvagere, Jean Teulère – Espoir de la Mare, Didier Courrèges – Deba d'Estruval, Cédric Lyard – Fine Merveille, Arnaud Boiteau – Expo du Moulin) (result changed after appeal)
 Fencing:
 Women's Individual Foil: Valentina Vezzali, ITA
 Gymnastics:
 Men's Artistic Individual All-Around: Paul Hamm, USA
 Judo:
 Women's 63–70 kg: Masae Ueno, JPN
 Men's 81–90 kg: Zurab Zviadauri, GEO
 Shooting:
 Women's 25m Sport Pistol: Mariya Grozdeva, BUL
 Women's Double Trap: Kimberly Rhode, USA
 Swimming:
 Men's 100 m Freestyle: Pieter van den Hoogenband, NED
 Men's 200 m Breaststroke: Kosuke Kitajima, JPN
 Women's 200 m Butterfly: Otylia Jędrzejczak, POL
 Women's 4 × 200 m Freestyle Relay: United States (Natalie Coughlin, Carly Piper, Dana Vollmer, Kaitlin Sandeno)
 Weightlifting:
 Women's 58–63 kg: Nataliya Skakun, UKR
 Men's 62–69 kg: Guozheng Zhang, CHN

August 17, 2004 (Tuesday)
 2004 Summer Olympics: Gold medal winners on day 4: (BBC)
 Fencing:
 Men's Individual Épée: Marcel Fischer, SUI
 Women's Individual Sabre: Mariel Zagunis, USA
 Gymnastics:
 Women's Team Artistic: Romania (Oana Ban, Alexandra Eremia, Cătălina Ponor, Monica Roşu, Nicoleta Daniela Şofronie, Silvia Stroescu)
 Judo:
 Women's 57–63 kg: Ayumi Tanimoto, JPN
 Men's 73–81 kg: Ilias Iliadis, GRE
 Shooting:
 Men's 50 m Free Pistol: Mikhail Nestruev, RUS
 Men's Double Trap: Ahmed Al Maktoum, UAE
 Swimming:
 Men's 200 m Butterfly: Michael Phelps, USA
 Men's 4 × 200 m Freestyle Relay: United States (Michael Phelps, Ryan Lochte, Peter Vanderkaay, Klete Keller)
 Women's 200 m Freestyle: Camelia Potec, ROM
 Women's 200 m Medley: Yana Klochkova, UKR

August 16, 2004 (Monday)
 Ice hockey: Ivan Hlinka, head coach of the Czech team, dies after being injured in a car crash, days before training camp opens for the 2004 World Cup of Hockey. (CBC news)
 Test cricket: England beat the West Indies by seven wickets at Old Trafford in the third Test, securing the series. England's last-innings total of 231 is a record winning score in Old Trafford Tests. (BBC)
2004 Summer Olympics: Gold medal winners on day 3:
Diving:
Women's Synchronized 10 m Platform: Lao Lishi and Li Ting, CHN
Men's Synchronized 3m Springboard: Nikolaos Siranidis and Thomas Bimis, GRE
Fencing:
Men's Individual Foil: Brice Guyart, FRA
Gymnastics:
Men's Team Artistic: Japan (Takehiro Kashima, Hisashi Mizutori, Daisuke Nakano, Hiroyuki Tomita, Naoya Tsukahara, Isao Yoneda)
Judo:
Women's 52–57 kg: Yvonne Bönisch, GER
Men's 66–73 kg: Won Hee Lee, KOR
Shooting:
Women's Trap: Suzanne Balogh, AUS
Men's 10 m Air Rifle: Qinan Zhu, CHN
Swimming:
Men's 200 m Freestyle: Ian Thorpe, AUS
Men's 100 m Backstroke: Aaron Peirsol, USA
Women's 100 m Backstroke: Natalie Coughlin, USA
Women's 100 m Breaststroke: Luo Xuejuan, CHN
Weightlifting:
Women's 58 kg: Chen Yanqing, CHN
Men's 62 kg: Zhiyong Shi, CHN
Baseball: Chipper Jones of the Atlanta Braves hits his 300th career home run in a 5–4 victory over the San Diego Padres. AtlantaBraves.com
Softball: Ninotska Amaro, her sister Alizabeth and Joselyn Steider combine to throw a perfect game, as team Puerto Rico beats the Red Mountain team from Mesa, Arizona, as part of the Senior League Softball World Series.
Boxing: Former world Bantamweight champion Robert Quiroga, 35, is found murdered in his hometown of San Antonio, Texas.

August 15, 2004 (Sunday)
Michael Schumacher wins the Formula One Hungarian Grand Prix, securing the constructors' championship for Ferrari. Schumacher sets two driver records—12 victories in a season, and seven consecutive victories in a season. (ESPN.com)
PGA Championship: Vijay Singh wins the PGA Championship in a three-hole playoff, defeating Justin Leonard and Chris DiMarco. Singh wins his second career championship in spite of failing to shoot a birdie during regulation play in the 4th round. (ESPN.com)
NASCAR: Tony Stewart wins the Sirius at the Glen race in Watkins Glen, New York, despite suffering from leg and stomach cramps for most of the event. (ESPN.com)
2004 Summer Olympics
Olympic Basketball: The Puerto Rican National Basketball Team beats the United States, 92–73, recording only the third loss in Olympic competition for the U.S. team, and the first since NBA players were allowed to compete. (ESPN)
Argentina beats Serbia and Montenegro 83–82 after a last-second, off-the-floor basket by Manu Ginóbili, which provoked an angry outburst by Serbia-Montenegro's head coach. (ESPN)
Gold medal winners on day 2:
Cycling:
Women's Road race: Sara Carrigan, AUS
Fencing:
Women's Individual Épée: Tímea Nagy, HUN
Judo:
Women's 48–52 kg: Dongmei Xian, CHN
Men's 60–66 kg: Masato Uchishiba, JPN
Shooting:
Women's 10 m Air Pistol: Olena Kostevych, UKR
Men's Trap: Alexei Alipov, RUS
Swimming:
Women's 100 m Butterfly: Petria Thomas, AUS
Women's 400 m Freestyle: Laure Manaudou, FRA
Men's 100 m Breaststroke: Kosuke Kitajima, JPN
Men's 4 × 100 m Freestyle Relay: South Africa (Roland Mark Schoeman, Lyndon Ferns, Darian Townsend, Ryk Neethling)
Weightlifting:
Women's 53 kg: Udomporn Polsak, THA
Men's 56 kg: Halil Mutlu, TUR

August 14, 2004 (Saturday)
 2004 Summer Olympics: Gold medal winners on day 1:
 Cycling:
 Men's Road Race: Paolo Bettini, ITA
 Diving:
 Women's Synchronized 3m Springboard: Minxia Wu and Jingjing Guo, CHN
 Men's Synchronized 10 m Platform: Tian Liang and Jinghui Yang, CHN
 Fencing
 Men's Individual Sabre: Aldo Montano, ITA
 Judo
 Women's Under 48 kg: Ryoko Tani, JPN
 Men's Under 60 kg: Tadahiro Nomura, JPN
 Shooting:
 Women's 10 m Air Rifle: Li Du, CHN
 Men's 10 m Air Pistol: Wang Yifu, CHN
 Swimming
 Men's 400 m Individual Medley: Michael Phelps, USA
 Men's 400 m Freestyle: Ian Thorpe, AUS
 Women's 400 m Individual Medley: Yana Klochkova, UKR
 Women's 4 × 100 m Freestyle Relay: Australia (Alice Mills, Libby Lenton, Petria Thomas, Jodie Henry)
 Weightlifting
 Women's 48 kg: Nurcan Taylan, TUR
 Rugby union: In the fifth match of the Tri Nations Series, held at Ellis Park in Johannesburg, the Springboks (South Africa), behind a three-try effort by Marius Joubert, defeat the All Blacks (New Zealand) 40–26. This ends the All Blacks' chances of defending their Tri Nations crown, and sets up a winner-take-all showdown on 21 August between the Boks and the Wallabies (Australia) in Durban. (BBC)

August 13, 2004 (Friday)
The 2004 Olympic Games officially open in Athens(ESPN)
Liverpool F.C. sell striker Michael Owen to Real Madrid for a fee of 12 million euros plus the midfielder Antonio Nunez.
Sprinters Konstantinos Kenteris and Ekaterini Thanou are suspended from the Greek Olympic team after missing a compulsory doping test, and face possible expulsion from the games. (BBC)

August 12, 2004 (Thursday)
French footballer Zinedine Zidane, one of the most celebrated players of all time, announces his international retirement. (BBC)
 UEFA Cup 2004–05 Second qualifying round first leg:
FC Zeleznik 2 – 4 FC Steaua București
FK Dukla Banská Bystrica 3 – 1 FC Wil 1900
NK Zeljeznicar Sarajevo 1 – 2 PFC Litex Lovech
FC Nistru Otaci 1 – 2 SK Sigma Olomouc
FC Artmedia Bratislava 0 – 3 FC Dnipro Dnipropetrovsk
FC Tbilisi 0 – 1 Legia Warszawa
FC Illichivets Mariupol 0 – 0 FK Austria Wien
FC Metalurh Donetsk 3 – 0 FC Tiraspol
Glentoran F.C. 0 – 1 IF Elfsborg
Odd Grenland 3 – 1 FK Ekranas
FK Ventspils 0 – 0 Brøndby IF
Stabæk 3 – 1 FC Haka
Östers IF 2 – 2 FK Liepājas Metalurgs
Dinamo Zagreb 4 – 0 NK Primorje
SK Slavia Praha 3 – 1 Dinamo Tbilisi FC
Újpest FC 3 – 1 Servette FC
PFC Levski Sofia 5 – 0 FK Modriča
FC Oţelul Galaţi 0 – 0 FK Partizan
AEK Larnaca F.C. 3 – 0 Maccabi Petach Tikva FC
FC Terek Grozny 1 – 0 Lech Poznań
F.K. Bodø/Glimt 2 – 1 FC Levadia Tallinn
Fimleikafélag Hafnarfjarðar 2 – 2 Dunfermline Athletic F.C.
K.S.K.Beveren 3 – 1 FC Vaduz
Amica Wronki 1 – 0 Budapest Honvéd FC
Gençlerbirligi 1 – 0 NK Rijeka
SK Rapid Wien 0 – 2 FC Rubin Kazan
Hammarby IF 2 – 0 ÍA Akranes
Hapoel Bnei Sakhnin FC 3 – 0 KF Partizani Tirana
FK Zalgiris Vilnius 1 – 3 Aalborg Boldspilklub (UEFA)

August 11, 2004 (Wednesday)
 UEFA Champions League 2004–05 Third qualifying round, first leg:
Shelbourne 0 – 0 Deportivo de La Coruña
Ferencváros 1 – 0 AC Sparta Praha
FC Shakhtar Donetsk 4 – 1 Club Brugge KV
FK Crvena Zvezda 3 – 2 PSV Eindhoven
Bayer Leverkusen 5 – 0 FC Baník Ostrava
FC Basel 1 – 1 Internazionale
NK Gorica 0 – 3 AS Monaco FC
Wisła Kraków 0 – 2 Real Madrid
Rosenborg 2 – 1 Maccabi Haifa F.C.
F.C. Dinamo București 1 – 2 Manchester United F.C. (UEFA)
Tennis: Serena Williams withdraws from Olympic competition due to an injury to her knee. (NYT)

August 10, 2004 (Tuesday)
Kobe Bryant's accuser files a federal lawsuit against the Los Angeles Laker star, asking for $75,000 in compensatory damages and an undisclosed amount in punitive damages. Bryant's attorneys had no comment. (AP)
 Boston Celtic and former Los Angeles Lakers star Rick Fox divorces his wife of five years, movie star Vanessa Williams (ESPN)
 UEFA Champions League 2004–05 Third qualifying round, first leg:
PFC CSKA Moskva 2 – 1 Rangers F.C.
Dynamo Kyiv 1 – 2 Trabzonspor
S.L. Benfica 1 – 0 R.S.C. Anderlecht
Grazer AK 0 – 2 Liverpool F.C.
Juventus 2 – 2 Djurgårdens IF
P.A.O.K. F.C. 1 – 2 Maccabi Tel Aviv F.C. (UEFA)
(Match subsequently awarded 0 – 3 to Maccabi, because PAOK fielded an ineligible player – UEFA.com).
 UEFA Cup 2004–05 Second qualifying round first leg:
FK Budućnost Banatski Dvor 1 – 2 NK Maribor
SV Pasching 3 – 1 FC Zenit St Peterburg
AC Omonia 1 – 1 CSKA Sofia (UEFA)
 NFL:
New York Giants co-owner Robert Tisch announces he has inoperable brain cancer. (ESPN)
Anquan Boldin of the Arizona Cardinals, the NFL's 2003–04 offensive Rookie of the Year, is injured during practice. (ESPN)
 Tennis: Guillermo Coria and Jennifer Capriati pull out of the Olympic competition due to injuries; Lisa Raymond is announced as substitute to Capriati.(ESPN)
 Baseball: New York Mets pitcher Tom Glavine is hospitalized after being involved in a car collision; he lost two upper teeth and suffered injuries to his lips.(ESPN)

August 9, 2004 (Monday)
Baseball: Edgar Martínez announces that he will retire after the 2004 Major League Baseball season

August 8, 2004 (Sunday)
 The United States basketball team defeats Turkey, 79–67, despite 11 3-point shots by Turkey. (Yahoo!)
 NFL: John Elway, Barry Sanders, Carl Eller and Bob Brown are officially inducted into the Pro Football Hall of Fame at Canton, Ohio. (ESPN/AP)
 NASCAR Nextel Cup: Jeff Gordon wins the Brickyard 400 for the fourth time in his career. (ESPN.com)
 ATP Masters Series: Andre Agassi wins the Cincinnati Masters for a third time, beating Lleyton Hewitt in the final to collect a record 17th ATP Masters Series title.

August 7, 2004 (Saturday)
 Asian Cup 2004 soccer: Defending champions Japan defeat hosts China 3–1 in a controversial final which prompted a riot in Beijing. (Asian Cup Official Website)
Baseball: Greg Maddux of the Chicago Cubs defeats the San Francisco Giants, 8–4 for his 300th career pitching victory.
Boxing: Diego Corrales defeats Acelino Freitas by a tenth-round knockout, to win the WBO world lightweight title.(Boxing Central)
Rugby union: In the fourth match of the Tri Nations Series, held in Sydney, the Wallabies (Australia) defeat the All Blacks (New Zealand) 23–18. The result throws the series wide open, with all three participants—the Wallabies, All Blacks, and Springboks (South Africa)—having a chance to win the series going into the final two matches in South Africa. (BBC)

August 6, 2004 (Friday)
Asian Cup 2004 soccer: In an exciting third-fourth playoff, Iran defeats Bahrain 4–2 with two late goals by Ali Daei in the last 10 minutes. Three players were red carded in the match, the most in any games of the Asian Cup. Asian Cup Official Website
Bouncing back from their loss to Italy, the United States Dream Team basketball team defeats Serbia and Montenegro, the world champions, 78–60. (Yahoo!)

August 4, 2004 (Wednesday)
 NFL: The Dallas Cowboys release quarterback Quincy Carter, who started all 16 games for the team last year. (NY Times) ESPN has reported that Carter tested positive for an illegal substance just before his release, and that he was in the NFL's substance abuse program.
 Baseball: The New York Yankees beat the Oakland Athletics, 8–6, with an eleventh inning home run hit by Alex Rodriguez, in a nationally televised game. (ESPN)
 Basketball: A three-pointer by Allen Iverson from near half-court with less than a second to go lifts the Dream Team 80–77 over Germany in a friendly game held in Cologne. German NBA superstar Dirk Nowitzki, who had tied the game with a three-pointer of his own seconds before Iverson's shot, led all scorers with 32 points. (ESPN)
In a blockbuster trade, the Atlanta Hawks trade Jason Terry, Alan Henderson and a future first round draft pick to the Dallas Mavericks for Antoine Walker and Tony Delk. (ESPN)
The Detroit Pistons trade center Corliss Williamson to the Philadelphia 76ers for Derrick Coleman and Amal McCaskill. (ESPN)
 UEFA Champions League 2004–05 Second qualifying round, second leg (team progressing to next round in bold):
AC Sparta Praha 2 – 1 APOEL
F.C. Dinamo București 1 – 0 MŠK Žilina
FK Crvena Zvezda 3 – 0 BSC Young Boys
Trabzonspor 3 – 0 Skonto Riga
PFC Lokomotiv Plovdiv 0 – 4 Club Brugge
Shelbourne 2 – 0 HNK Hajduk Split
FBK Kaunas 0 – 2 Djurgårdens IF
FC Sheriff Tiraspol 0 – 2 Rosenborg

August 3, 2004 (Tuesday)
Asian Cup 2004: Hosts China thrill fans by defeating Iran in a penalty shootout 4–3. Iran missed their fourth and fifth shots. The game was tied 1–1 aet. In the other match, Bahrain ties Japan in a hard-fought match 3–3, with Japan only tying on the 90th minute of regulation play. Japan scores first in extra time, however, and keeps the score at 4–3 to win the game.
Basketball: Team Italy upsets the United States' Dream Team, 95–78, during a friendly in Cologne, Germany. (ESPN)
 UEFA Champions League 2004–05 Second qualifying round, second leg (team progressing to next round in bold):
Ferencváros 0 – 1 SK Tirana (Ferencváros progress on the away goals rule).
Wisła Kraków 3 – 0 WIT Georgia Tbilisi
PFC CSKA Moskva 2 – 0 Neftchi
Maccabi Tel Aviv F.C. 1 – 0 HJK Helsinki
FC København 0 – 5 NK Gorica
FC Shakhtar Donetsk 1 – 0 Pyunik

August 2, 2004 (Monday)
 Horse racing: The owners of Smarty Jones, the horse who gained popularity with his spirited pursuit of the Triple Crown, announce that he is forced to retire due to deep bruises in all four of his legs. Smarty was the first undefeated horse to win Kentucky Derby since Seattle Slew, in his retirement he will reside in the exact same stall that Slew retired to in Kentucky. (ESPN.com)
 National Football League: Running back Ricky Williams files paperwork officially declaring his retirement from the NFL at the age of 27. Williams, who rushed for 6,354 yards in his 5 NFL seasons for the New Orleans Saints and, most recently, the Miami Dolphins, told Miami he was leaving the team a week earlier. Because Williams is part of the NFL's substance abuse program, he is forbidden from playing in 2004 should he choose to unretire. (ESPN.com)

August 1, 2004 (Sunday)
 Test cricket: England win the second Test match against the West Indies at Edgbaston by 256 runs. During the match Marcus Trescothick becomes the first batsman to score centuries in both innings of an Edgbaston Test. (BBC)
 Football (soccer): Mark Palios resigns as chief executive of the English Football Association. Both he and the England head coach Sven-Göran Eriksson have admitted affairs with the same woman: Faria Alam, an FA secretary. Palios does not admit any wrongdoing (he, Eriksson, and the secretary are all unmarried) but says he feels his action is necessary to help the Football Association return to normality. Eriksson is also under pressure to resign. (BBC)

References

08